Alkalihalobacillus ligniniphilus is a Gram-positive, alkaliphilic and halotolerant bacterium from the genus of Alkalihalobacillus which has been isolated from sediments from the South China Sea.

References

Bacillaceae
Bacteria described in 2014